Matthew Henry Kramer  (born 9 June 1959) is an American philosopher, currently Professor of Legal and Political Philosophy at the University of Cambridge and a Fellow of Churchill College, Cambridge. He writes mainly in the areas of metaethics, normative ethics, legal philosophy, and political philosophy. He is a leading proponent of legal positivism. He has been Director of the Cambridge Forum for Legal and Political Philosophy since 2000. He has been teaching at Cambridge University and at Churchill College since 1994.

Career 
Kramer was born in Massachusetts and educated at Middleborough High School, Cornell University (B.A. in Philosophy) where he became a member of the Phi Beta Kappa Society, Harvard University (J.D.) and Cambridge University (Ph.D. in Philosophy and LL.D.).

His seventeen books as author and four as editor, as well as his dozens of journal articles, range over many areas of legal, political and moral philosophy. He has received several major research awards including a Guggenheim Foundation Fellowship (2001) and a Leverhulme Trust Major Research Fellowship (2005). He is a subject editor for the Routledge Encyclopedia of Philosophy and is on the editorial board of the Oxford Studies in Political Philosophy, the American Journal of Jurisprudence, Law & Philosophy, Ratio Juris, and Legal Theory. He is also an Advisory Editor for the University of Bologna Law Review (general student-edited law journal).

At the undergraduate level he lectures and supervises in Jurisprudence, and he also lectures on Topics in Legal & Political Philosophy in the postgraduate LL.M. program. At Cambridge, he is a graduate supervisor both for Ph.D. students in the Law Faculty and for M.Phil. and Ph.D. students in the Philosophy Faculty.

He was a visiting professor at Hebrew University of Jerusalem in April 2009, and at Tel Aviv University in March 2012.

In 2014 he was elected a Fellow of the British Academy, the United Kingdom's national academy for the humanities and social sciences.

Inclusive legal positivism 

An inclusive legal positivist, Kramer argues in his book Where Law and Morality Meet that moral principles can enter into the law of any jurisdiction. He contends that legal officials can invoke moral principles as laws for resolving disputes, and that they can also invoke them as threshold tests which ordinary laws must satisfy. In opposition to many other theorists, Kramer argues that these functions of moral principles are consistent with all the essential characteristics of any legal system. He is also a leading proponent of the legal positivist argument that law and morality are separable, arguing against the position of natural-law theory, which portrays legal requirements as a species of moral requirements. According to him, even though the existence of a legal system in any sizeable society is essential for the realization of fundamental moral values, law is not inherently moral either in its effects or in its motivational underpinnings.

Moral realism as a moral doctrine 

Influenced by the theories of Ronald Dworkin, Kramer is a moral realist who argues that "moral requirements are strongly objective" and that "the objectivity of ethics is itself an ethical matter that rests primarily on ethical considerations." In his book Moral Realism as a Moral Doctrine, he thus claims that "[m]oral realism - the doctrine that morality is indeed objective - is a moral doctrine." Unlike Dworkin, he believes that, although there is a determinately correct moral answer to most moral questions, there exists genuine moral indeterminacy in relation to some rare moral questions. He also distances himself from Dworkin's defense of value monism.

Publications 
Books
Legal Theory, Political Theory, and Deconstruction: Against Rhadamanthus (Bloomington, IN: Indiana University Press, 1991), xvii + 335 pp.
Critical Legal Theory and the Challenge of Feminism: A Philosophical Reconception (Lanham, MD: Rowman & Littlefield, 1995). xviii + 332 pp.
John Locke and the Origins of Private Property: Philosophical Explorations of Individualism, Community, and Equality (Cambridge: Cambridge University Press, 1997), xii + 347 pp.
Hobbes and the Paradoxes of Political Origins (Basingstoke: Macmillan Press, 1997), xii + 144 pp.
A Debate Over Rights: Philosophical Enquiries (Oxford: Oxford University Press, 1998) [with Nigel Simmonds and Hillel Steiner], viii + 307 pp.
In the Realm of Legal and Moral Philosophy: Critical Encounters (Basingstoke: Macmillan Press, 1999), x + 202 pp.
In Defense of Legal Positivism: Law Without Trimmings (Oxford: Oxford University Press, 1999), ix + 313 pp.
Rights, Wrongs, and Responsibilities (Basingstoke: Palgrave [Macmillan], 2001) [editor and principal contributor], xv + 247 pp.
The Quality of Freedom (Oxford: Oxford University Press, 2003), xi + 482 pp.
Where Law and Morality Meet (Oxford: Oxford University Press, 2004), viii + 301 pp.
Objectivity and the Rule of Law (Cambridge: Cambridge University Press, 2007), xiv + 247 pp.
Moral Realism as a Moral Doctrine (Oxford: Blackwell [Wiley-Blackwell], 2009), viii + 387 pp.
The Ethics of Capital Punishment (Oxford: Oxford University Press, 2011), xii + 353 pp.
Torture and Moral Integrity: A Philosophical Enquiry (Oxford: Oxford University Press, 2014), xv + 339 pp.
Liberalism with Excellence (Oxford: Oxford University Press, 2017), xiv + 432 pp.
H.L.A. Hart: The Nature of Law (Cambridge: Polity Press, 2018), ix + 238 pp.
Freedom of Expression as Self-Restraint (Oxford: Oxford University Press, 2021), xiii + 346 pp.
Without Trimmings: The Legal, Moral, and Political Philosophy of Matthew Kramer [edited by Visa Kurki and Mark McBride; pp 363-552 and 573-93 are by Kramer] (Oxford: Oxford University Press, 2022)

References 

1959 births
20th-century American philosophers
21st-century American philosophers
Academics of the University of Cambridge
Alumni of Trinity College, Cambridge
American legal scholars
American philosophy academics
Analytic philosophers
Cornell University alumni
Ethicists
Fellows of Churchill College, Cambridge
Fellows of the British Academy
Harvard Law School alumni
Living people
Metaphilosophers
Metaphysicians
Moral realists
Philosophers of law
Philosophy writers
Political philosophers